Rutger Arisz (born 11 February 1970) is a Dutch rower. He won a gold medal at the 1989 World Rowing Championships in Bled with the men's quadruple sculls.

References

1970 births
Living people
Dutch male rowers
World Rowing Championships medalists for the Netherlands
Olympic rowers of the Netherlands
Rowers at the 1992 Summer Olympics
20th-century Dutch people